Raphaël Enthoven (born 9 November 1975) is a French philosophy teacher, radio host and television host. An agrégé who taught at Jean Moulin University Lyon 3 and Paris Diderot University, Enthoven is known to the French public for hosting various philosophy-related shows on radio and television. Although he has been described as a philosopher, Enthoven himself rejects being labeled as such.

Career
After obtaining the qualification in philosophy from École Normale Supérieure, he taught for two years at the Jean Moulin University Lyon 3, then at the University of Paris VII-Jussieu, and during the first two years (2002 and 2003) at the Université populaire de Caen, founded by Michel Onfray, where he runs the general philosophy seminar. After distancing himself from the latter, he became co-producer of the radio show  Les vendredis de la philosophie on France Culture. Having previously lectured political philosophy at the Sciences Po (2000-2003, 2005-2007), and at the École Polytechnique (2007-2010), he also taught on Spinoza, Bergson and Clément Rosset on Les mardis de la philo and the Bibliothèque nationale de France on the meaning of life. Since 2013, he also teaches philosophy to first and second year high-school students at the École Jeannine Manuel, a private bilingual high-school.

He is the adviser to the editor of Philosophie Magazine, where he holds the "Meaning and life", it is still in production at France Culture.  Having dealt with the Appointment Policy, in partnership with the magazine L'Express, he has become an everyday icon in the new program schedule for France Culture in 2008-2009 by bringing to life the show The new paths of knowledge  Monday to Friday at 17h.

Since October 2008, he has produced the show Philosophy broadcast on Sunday at 1pm on Arte.
He read Marcel Proust in Les Intermittences du cœur and Albertine endormie, with Karol Beffa as pianist.

Personal life
Enthoven was born in Paris, the son of journalist Catherine David and publisher Jean-Paul Enthoven. In 1996, he married writer Justine Lévy, daughter of philosopher Bernard-Henri Lévy, himself a friend of Enthoven's father. In 2000, Enthoven began an affair with singer Carla Bruni while she was the mistress of Raphaël’s father and which eventually prompted divorce from Lévy in 2001. Justine Lévy wrote a fictionalized version of the story in her book Nothing Serious. In 2020, Enthoven himself penned a fictionalized account of their marriage titled with the Proustian title  Le Temps Gagne.

In June 2001, Enthoven had a son named Aurélien with Carla Bruni. In 2007, he separated from Bruni and began a relationship with actress Chloé Lambert, who gave birth to their son in 2008. They are said to have separated around 2012. In October 2014, he had a son with sailor and politician Maud Fontenoy. As of 2016, he had four children.

Bibliography
Un jeu d'enfant : la philosophie, Paris, Fayard, 2007 ; Pocket, 2008.
L'Endroit du décor, Paris, Gallimard, 2009.
Lectures de Proust, Paris, Bayard, 2013.
Matière Première, Paris, Gallimard, 2013.
Le Temps gagné, Paris, Éditions de l'Observatoire, 2020.

References

External links

 Raphaël Enthoven - Twitter
 Official website

1975 births
Chevaliers of the Ordre des Arts et des Lettres
École Normale Supérieure alumni
Academic staff of Sciences Po
French people of Algerian-Jewish descent
French male writers
French radio presenters
French television presenters
Jewish French writers
Jewish philosophers
Living people
Lycée Henri-IV alumni
Prix Femina essai winners
Radio France people
Writers from Paris